Tasi Limtiaco,  (born 4 January 1994) is a Micronesian swimmer, He competed in the men's 200 metre individual medley event at the 2020 Summer Olympics.

Life 
He is the national record holder in multiple events. He studied abroad in Japan and attended Yamanashi Gakuin University. While in university, he joined the swim team.

Competition record

Best Results

References

External links
 

1994 births
Living people
Federated States of Micronesia male swimmers
Olympic swimmers of the Federated States of Micronesia
Swimmers at the 2020 Summer Olympics